Williams Héctor Alarcón Cepeda (born 29 November 2000) is a Chilean footballer who plays as a midfielder for Ibiza on loan from Primera División club Unión La Calera.

Career
On 31 January 2023, Alarcón signed for Segunda División club Ibiza on loan until the end of the season with an option to buy.

International career
He represented Chile at under-23 level in the 2019 Toulon Tournament and the 1–0 win against Peru U23 on 31 August 2022, in the context of preparations for the 2023 Pan American Games.

At senior level, he made his debut in the friendly match against Morocco on 23 September 2022.

Personal life
He is the son of the former footballer of the same name , who was also a product of Colo-Colo youth system.

Career statistics

Club

Notes

International

References

External links
 

2000 births
Living people
Footballers from Santiago
Chilean footballers
Association football midfielders
Chile international footballers
Chile youth international footballers
Colo-Colo footballers
Unión La Calera footballers
UD Ibiza players
Chilean Primera División players
Chilean expatriate footballers
Expatriate footballers in Spain
Chilean expatriate sportspeople in Spain